Jenny Gamble is Professor Emeritus of Midwifery at Griffith University and Director of Transforming Maternity Care Collaborative

She has been President of the Queensland Branch of the Australian College of Midwives and National President of the Australian College of Midwives from 2009-2010. She is an author, academic, researcher and midwife.. She is an expert in models of maternity care for optimum health outcomes.

As well as representing midwifery in Queensland, she is an expert on traumatic birth and counselling methods to overcome the trauma of a poor birth.

References

External links
 Professor Gamble talking about research 
 Professor Gamble's article in [The Conversation] about traumatic stress after childbirth 

Australian midwives
Living people
Year of birth missing (living people)
Australian health activists